Gibberula mazagonica is a species of sea snail, a marine gastropod mollusk, in the family Cystiscidae.

References

mazagonica
Gastropods described in 1893
Cystiscidae